Raymond Bernard Seals (born June 17, 1965) is an American former football defensive end in the NFL. He is famous for not having attended college, a rarity in the NFL. Ray lettered in football at Anthony A. Henninger High School in Syracuse, New York. Seals started in Super Bowl XXX as a member of the Pittsburgh Steelers.

Ray Seals went from playing for the minor-league Syracuse Express of the Empire Football League to the Tampa Bay Buccaneers in 1989. He went to the Steelers in 1994 as a free agent and played two seasons as their starting right defensive end. He was injured in 1996, his third season with the Steelers, and finished with Carolina in 1997.

Ray Seals was inducted into the American Football Association's Semi-Pro Football Hall of Fame in 1992. Seals's cousin, Jonny Gammage, was killed after a traffic stop by Pittsburgh Police officers in 1995.

References 

1965 births
Living people
African-American players of American football
American football defensive ends
Carolina Panthers players
Players of American football from Syracuse, New York
Pittsburgh Steelers players
Tampa Bay Buccaneers players
21st-century African-American people
20th-century African-American sportspeople